Chernevo is a rural locality (a village) in Novlenskoye Rural Settlement, Vologodsky District, Vologda Oblast, Russia. The population was 12 as of 2002.

Geography 
Chernevo is located 54 km northwest of Vologda (the district's administrative centre) by road. Vladychnevo is the nearest rural locality.

References 

Rural localities in Vologodsky District